Ben-Ousséni Mansour, alias Manou Mansour (Mamoudzou, Mayotte, 24 February 1980) is a French poet.

He is the eldest of nine children of Ousséni Mansour (nurse) and Amina Angatahi (housewife). He grew up in the south of Mayotte island, in Bouéni.

Works 
Lettres mahoraises (2008)
L'auberge mahoraise (2009)
Odes à l'homme perverti (2009)
La Poésie en soi-Amante du Poète (2010)
Ravi que le temps ait juste un peu rouillé mes terres  (2012)
Le droit de renaître (2012)

References and external links
 www.babelio.com

1980 births
Living people
French poets
21st-century French non-fiction writers
People from Mayotte
French male poets